TVMax is a commercial privately owned TV station in Panama City, Panama that is available all over the country.  It is owned by TVN Media which owns flagship and sister channel TVN
  
This channel was created to absorb all the sports programming of TVN. A sports news program was created.  It also received most of the series, sitcoms and reality shows from TVN, and acquired new ones. TV MAX is aimed towards the male audience and people who like sports and foreign TV series. It has become a very popular TV station in the country.

References
 CARRERA POR LOS ‘RATINGS’ Newspaper article in La Prensa 
 TVMax official website 

Television stations in Panama
Television channels and stations established in 2005
Mass media in Panama City